

The International Latitude Service was created by the International Geodetic Association in 1899 to study variations in latitude caused by polar motion, precession, or "wobble" of the Earth's axis.

The original International Latitude Observatories were a system of six observatories located near the parallel of 39° 08' north latitude. The alignment of all six stations along the parallel helped the observatories to perform uniform data analysis. The original six observatories were located in:
 Gaithersburg, Maryland, United States
 Cincinnati, Ohio, United States
 Ukiah, California, United States
 Mizusawa, Iwate, Japan
 Charjui, Turkmenistan
 Carloforte, Italy

Twelve groups of stars were studied in the program, each group containing six pairs of stars.  Each night, each station observed two of the star groups along a preset schedule and later compared the data against the measurements taken by the sister stations.
Economic difficulties and war caused the closings of some of the original stations, though a newer station was created in Uzbekistan after World War I.  The data collected by the observatories over the years still has use to scientists, and has been applied to studies of polar motion, the physical properties of the Earth, climatology and satellite tracking and navigation.

The final six observatories were located, in order of Longitude (E to W), in:
Gaithersburg, Maryland, USA, Gaithersburg Latitude Observatory: 
Cincinnati, Ohio, USA: 
Ukiah, California, USA: 
Mizusawa, Japan, National Institutes of Natural Sciences National Astronomical Observatory of Japan, Mizusawa VERA Observatory: 
Kitab, in Uzbekistan: 
Carloforte, Italy: 

The ILS was renamed International Polar Motion Service (IPMS) in 1962. 
It was replaced when the International Earth Rotation Service (IERS) was established in 1987.

See also
 List of astronomical observatories

References

Further reading

External links
 National Park Service - The history of the Gaithersburg Observatory in Maryland, and the overall project.

Astronomical observatories
Astronomical observatories in Italy
Astronomical observatories in Japan
Astronomical observatories in California
Astronomical observatories in Uzbekistan
Buildings and structures in Cincinnati
Buildings and structures in Mendocino County, California
Astronomical observatories in Ohio
Astronomical observatories in Maryland
Buildings and structures in Gaithersburg, Maryland
Geodesy organizations